Brazil competed at the 1996 Summer Olympics in Atlanta, United States. 225 athletes – 159 men, 66 women – competed in 18 sports. The country set a record with both 15 medals – only surpassed in 2008 – and 3 golds – surpassed in 2004 with five.

In the debutant beach volleyball, several remarkable achievements were earned when it happened the all-Brazilian final between Sandra Pires and Jackie Silva (who won gold) and Mônica Rodrigues and Adriana Samuel:
the first Olympic medals ever won by Brazilian women in any sport
the first Olympic gold medal ever won by Brazilian women.
the first medal ever earned in beach volleyball
the first gold medal ever in the sport.

Brazil has also won the first medal ever in Equestrian, when the team jumping conquered the bronze medal, marking also the first medal ever in a mixed gender Olympic event.

Summary
After 76 years since the debut of the country at the 1920 Summer Olympics, Brazilian women finally won Olympic medals. That happened for the first time in the all-Brazilians beach volleyball final between Sandra Pires and Jackie Silva (who won gold) and Mônica Rodrigues and Adriana Samuel. Beach volleyball competitions made its debut at 1996 Summer Olympics.

The other two gold medals were both obtained in Sailing events. Robert Scheidt was gold medalist in the Laser class. Torben Grael and Marcelo Ferreira won Star class. It was the first medal of Robert Scheidt and the third medal of Torben Grael; both sailors are the onliest Brazilian athletes with the record of five Olympic medals (two of them are gold). Besides the two gold medals, a bronze medal was also obtained in sailing by Torben's brother Lars Grael and Kiko Pellicano in Tornado class.

Brazil women's national basketball team, led by Hortência Marcari, Janeth Arcain and Maria Paula Silva, had a great performance, losing the gold medal match to host country United States women's national basketball team. It was the first medal won by women in Basketball.

The swimmer Gustavo Borges obtained the silver medal in men's 200 metre freestyle and the bronze medal in 100 metre freestyle. The other medal obtained in swimmer was the bronze medal conquered by Fernando Scherer in men's 50 m freestyle.

Brazil women's national volleyball team, finally won its first Olympic medal after a hard bronze medal match against Russia by 3 sets to 2.

At the men's football tournament, the under-23 football team lost a dramatic semifinal to Nigeria by 4–3, after being winning the match by 3 to 0. In the bronze medal match, Brazil beat Portugal by 5–0.

At the Judo events, Brazil won two bronze medals. The 1988 Olympic champion Aurélio Miguel obtained a medal in men's 95 kg category, while Henrique Guimarães was the medalist in men's 65 kg category.

The bronze medal obtained by equestrians Luiz Felipe de Azevedo, André Johannpeter, Alvaro Miranda Neto and Rodrigo Pessoa in team jumping was the first of the History of the country not only in Equestrian as also in a mixed gender Olympic event, tough all 4 members of the team were men.

Finally, Robson da Silva, Édson Ribeiro, André da Silva and Arnaldo da Silva obtained for the first time ever a medal in a relay event in Athletics, the bronze in the men's 4 × 100 metres relay.

Medalists

| width=78% align=left valign=top |

|  style="text-align:left; width:22%; vertical-align:top;"|

Multiple medallist

The following competitor won several medals at the 1996 Olympic Games.

Athletics

Men
Track & road events

Field events

Women
Track & road events

Field events

Basketball

Men's tournament

Team roster

 Ratto
 Tonico
 Josuel
 Caio
 Caio da Silveira
 Olívia
 Ferraciú
 Pipoka
 Janjão
 Oscar Schmidt
 Rogério
 Wilson Minucci

Group play

Quarterfinal

Classification game 5th-8th place

5th place game

Women's tournament

Team roster
 Hortência
 Paula
 Janeth
 Marta Sobral
 Alessandra
 Branca
 Adriana
 Leila
 Roseli
 Silvinha
 Cíntia
 Cláudia

Group play

Quarterfinal

Semifinal

Gold medal game

Boxing

Canoeing

Slalom

Sprint
Men

Cycling

Road

Men

Mountain biking

Men

Equestrian

Eventing

Jumping

Football

Summary

Men's tournament 

Team roster
Head coach: Zagallo

Group play

Quarterfinal

Semifinal

Bronze medal match

Women's tournament 

Team roster
Head coach: José Duarte

Brazil named a squad of 16 players and 2 alternates for the tournament. During the tournament, Kátia replaced Nilda due to injury.

Group play

Semifinal

Bronze medal match

Handball 

Summary

Men's tournament 

Team roster
 Cezar Stelzner de Lima
 Edison Alves Freire
 Ivan Raimundo Pinheiro
 Marcos Antônio Cezar
 José Ronaldo do Nascimento
 Fausto Steinwandter
 Paulo Moratore
 Milton Fonseca Pelissari
 Daniel Pinheiro
 Agberto Correa de Matos
 Marcelo Minhoto Ferraz de Sampaio
 Winglitton Rocha Barros
 Ivan Bruno Maziero
 Rodrigo Hoffelder
 Osvaldo Inocente Filho
 Carlos Luciano Ertel

Group play

Eleventh place game

Judo 

Men

Women

Rowing 

Men

Sailing 

Men

Women

Mixed

Shooting

Men

Swimming

Men

Women

Table tennis 

Men

Women

Tennis

Volleyball

Beach

Indoor

Men's tournament 

Team roster
Gilson Bernardo
Nalbert Bitencourt
Giovane Gávio
Antonio Carlos Gouveia
Mauricio Lima
Fábio Marcelino
Marcelo Negrão
Cássio Pereira
Max Pereira
Alexandre Samuel
Carlos Schwanke
Paulo André Silva
Head coach:José Roberto Guimarães

Group play

|}

|}

Quarterfinal

|}

5th-8th place classification game

|}

5th place game

|}

Women's tournament 

Team roster
Ana Ida Alvares
Leila Barros
Ericleia Bodziak
Hilma Caldeira
Ana Paula Connelly *Marcia Fu Cunha
Virna Dias
Ana Moser
Ana Flavia Sanglard (c)
Hélia Souza
Sandra Suruagy
Fernanda Venturini
Head coach:Bernardo Rezende

Group play

|}

|}

Quarterfinal

|}

Semifinal

|}

Bronze medal game

|}

Weightlifting

See also
Brazil at the 1995 Pan American Games

References

 Official website of the Brazilian Olympic Committee
 sports-reference

Nations at the 1996 Summer Olympics
1996 Summer Olympics
Olympics